Kaso River, also Ci Kaso,  is a river in Sukabumi Regency, West Java, Indonesia, about 140 km south of the capital Jakarta.

Hydrology

The Cikaso River originates in North Sukabumi and flows south to the Surade subdistrict in South Sukabumi.
The Cikaso waterfall is in the Ujung tourist area between Jampang Kulon and Surade.
The falls are accessible from the Ciniti, Cibitung village in the Cibitung Kulon sub-Jampang. They can be reached by foot or by  motor boat.

Geography
The river flows in the southwest area of Java with predominantly tropical monsoon climate (designated as Am in the Köppen-Geiger climate classification). The annual average temperature in the area is 23 °C. The warmest month is August, when the average temperature is around 26 °C, and the coldest is January, at 20 °C. The average annual rainfall is 3834 mm. The wettest month is December, with an average of 578 mm rainfall, and the driest is September, with 35 mm rainfall.

See also
List of rivers of Indonesia
List of rivers of Java

References

Rivers of West Java
Rivers of Indonesia